Glossostigma is a genus of flowering plants in the lopseed family, Phrymaceae.

Species
There are six accepted species:

References

Phrymaceae
Plants described in 1836